Sunstate Coaches is an Australian coach operator founded in 1985 by Fred Carah. It operates coach charters in Brisbane as well as operating services under contract to NSW TrainLink.

Services
Sunstate operates services under contract to NSW TrainLink from Brisbane, Surfers Paradise Byron Bay to Casino and Grafton where connections are made with XPT train services to and from Sydney. Sunstate commenced operating variations of these services for CountryLink in January 1997. In July 2016, Sunstate commenced operating a new five-year contract.

Fleet
As at November 2015 the fleet consisted of 22 coaches. Fleet livery is white with cream and red stripes. Several coaches are painted in NSW TrainLink livery.

Depots
Sunstate operate depots in Eagle Farm and Burleigh.

References

Bus companies of Queensland
CountryLink
NSW TrainLink
1985 establishments in Australia